Marta Nikolayevna Kharitonova (born 26 September 1984) is a Russian slalom canoeist who has competed at the international level since 2002.

She won a bronze medal in the K1 team event at the 2019 ICF Canoe Slalom World Championships in La Seu d'Urgell. Kharitonova competed in the K1 event at the 2012 and 2016 Olympics placing 9th and 15th, respectively.

World Cup individual podiums

References

External links

 
 
 
 

Russian female canoeists
1984 births
Living people
Olympic canoeists of Russia
Canoeists at the 2012 Summer Olympics
Canoeists at the 2016 Summer Olympics
Medalists at the ICF Canoe Slalom World Championships
Sportspeople from Saint Petersburg